George Davies may refer to:
George Davies (athlete) (born 1940), American pole vaulter
George Davies (baseball) (1868–1906), American major league pitcher
George Davies (cricketer) (1892–1957), Australian cricketer
George Davies (footballer, born 1897) (1897–1956), English footballer in the 1920s 
George Davies (footballer, born 1900) (1900–1942), English footballer in the 1920s
George Davies (footballer, born 1927) (born 1927), English footballer in the 1950s
George Davies (footballer, born 1996) (born 1996), Sierra Leonean footballer in the 2010s
George Davies (politician) (1875–1950), British Member of Parliament
George Davies (retailer) (born 1941), British fashion retailer
George Davies (rugby union) (1875–1959), Welsh international rugby player
George Maitland Lloyd Davies (1880–1949), British member of parliament
George Llewelyn Davies (1893–1915), with his brothers the inspiration for playwright J. M. Barrie's characters of Peter Pan and the Lost Boys
George Alfred Davies (1846–1897), mayor of Fremantle, Australia
John George Davies (1846–1913), generally known as (Sir) George Davies, a Tasmanian politician, newspaper proprietor and cricketer

See also
George Davys (1780–1864), tutor to Queen Victoria and bishop
George Davis (disambiguation)